Issyk-Kul District (Isıq-Köl rayonu, ىسىق-كۅل رايونۇ; , Issyk-kuljskij rajon) is a district of Issyk-Kul Region in north-eastern Kyrgyzstan. The seat lies at Cholpon-Ata.

Geography
The district is located on the northern shore of Issyk-Kul and on the southern slopes of the Küngöy Ala-Too Range, which dominate much of the landscape. The topography varies from multiple-folded medium-altitude mountains featuring in erosional dissection to alluvial - proluvial planes with river fans, river valleys, intermittent water streams, and lakeside planes of Issyk-Kul lake area. Approximately 78% of the district is occupied by mountains, and 22% - by valleys. The hydrological conditions are dominated by rivers Toru-Aygyr with peak flood of 30 m/s, Orto Taldy-Bulak - 6.5 m/s, Chong Taldy-Bulak - 7 m/s, Cholpon-Ata - 20 m/s, Dyure-Suu - 15 m/s, Kichi Ak-Suu - 10 m/s, Orto Koy-Suu - 10 m/s, Orto Oryuktyu - 10 m/s, Chong Oryuktyu - 20 m/s, Chet Baysoorun - 15 m/s, and Cong Baysoorun - 20 m/s.

Climate
An average temperature in January is -2°C in valleys, and -10°C in mountains. In July, an average temperature varies from +18°C in valleys, to +10°C in mountains. An absolute recorded temperature minimum is -30°. Average maximum temperatures are +35°C in valleys, and +15°C in mountains. Average yearly precipitation is 200-400 mm in valleys, and 500-600 mm in mountains during warm season (April-October), and 100-150 in valleys and 150-200 mm in mountains during cold season.

Population

Populated places
In total, Issyk-Kul District include 1 town and 30 settlements in 12 rural communities. Each rural community may include one or several villages. The rural communities and settlements in the Issyk-Kul District are:

town of district significance Cholpon-Ata
 Abdrakhmanov (seat: Jarkynbaev; incl. Karool-Döbö)
 Anan'yevo (seat: Anan'yevo; incl. Kök-Döbö and Chet-Baysoorun)
 Bosteri (seat: Bosteri; incl. Baktuu-Dolonotu)
 Kara-Oy (seat: Kara-Oy)
 Kum-Bel (seat: Korumdu; incl. Bulan-Sögöttü)
 Örüktü (seat: Chong-Örüktü; incl. Orto-Örüktü and Örüktü-Khutor)
 Sadyr Ake (seat: Grigor'yevka; incl. Grigor'yevka Pristany)
 Semyonovka (seat: Semyonovka; incl. Kojoyar)
 Tamchy (seat: Tamchy; incl. Kosh-Köl and Chyrpykty)
 Temir (seat: Temir; incl. Kashat)
 Toru-Aygyr (seat: Toru-Aygyr; incl. Kyzyl-Örük and Sary-Kamysh)
 Chong-Sary-Oy (seat: Chong-Sary-Oy; incl. Baetov, Örnök, Sary-Oy and Chok-Tal)

Gallery

References 

Districts of Issyk-Kul Region